"I Like It Both Ways" is a song by Australian glam rock band Supernaut. The song was released in May 1976 as the debut single from the band's debut studio album, Supernaut (1976).
 
Musically, "I Like It Both Ways" is a tough glam number, with heavy riffing throughout while the lyrics became a theme of bisexuality.

Track listing 
7" (Polydor 2079 082)
 Side A "I Like it Both Ways" - 3:46
 Side B "Lightning"

Charts

Weekly charts

Year-end charts

Cover versions
 Not From There covered the song on the soundtrack Sample People (2000).

References 

1976 songs
1976 singles
Polydor Records singles